Kurt Wahl (born 5 May 1912, date of death unknown) was a German fencer. He competed in the individual and team foil events at the 1952 Summer Olympics. Between 1955 and 1976, he was also the president of the Bavarian Fencing Federation.

References

1912 births
Year of death missing
German male fencers
Olympic fencers of West Germany
Fencers at the 1952 Summer Olympics